Almedina is a municipality in Ciudad Real, Castile-La Mancha, Spain. It has a population of 742.

Almedina (also spelt medina, almadinah, madinah or madinat) is an Arabic word that was passed to many other languages during and after the great Arab expansion by the Arabs of the Arabian Peninsula. Almedina simply means the city or the town. it is also the name of a major city in the Arabian Peninsula (modern day Saudi Arabia).

Municipalities in the Province of Ciudad Real